Fortunatus Nwachukwu  (born 10 May 1960)  is a Nigerian prelate of the Catholic Church who works in the Roman Curia as secretary of the Section of First Evangelization of the Dicastery for Evangelization. He joined the diplomatic service of the Holy See in 1994 and held the rank of apostolic nuncio from 2012, when he also became an archbishop.

Biography
Fortunatus Nwachukwu was born in Ntigha, in present-day Abia State, Nigeria, on 10 May 1960. He entered Immaculate Conception Seminary in Ahiaeke Umuahia in January 1972 and taught mathematics and Latin there from 1975 to 1977. He then studied at the philosophy faculty of the Bigard Memorial Seminary in Ikot Ekpene. He continued at the theology faculty from 1980 to 1984, earning his Bachelor of Divinity degree summa cum laude. He was ordained a priest for the Diocese of Umuahia on 17 June 1984 by Bishop Anthony Gogo Nwedo in St. Eugene Parish Church in Aba and incardinated in the newly created Diocese of Aba on 2 April 1990. After ordination he taught and then became vice-rector of the Immaculate Conception Seminary and parochial vicar and administrator of the St Anne’s Parish in Ibeku from 1984 to 1986. At the same time he was diocesan vocations director and chaplain of the Federal College of Agriculture and the Umuahia Campus of Alvan Ikoku College of Education, both in Umudike-Umuahia.

Beginning in 1986 he studied at the Pontifical Biblical Institute in Rome, the Hebrew University in Jerusalem and the Philosophisch-Theologische Hochschule, Sankt Georgen, in Frankfurt, Germany. He earned a doctorate in theology at the Pontifical Urban University in 1994 with a dissertation on "The Birth of Systematic Theology in Contemporary Black Africa: An Investigation Into New Interpretations of the Christian Faith by the Newly Evangelized". He also studied diplomacy for two years at the Pontifical Ecclesiastical Academy and entered the diplomatic service of the Holy See on 1 July 1994. His first assignments were in Ghana, Paraguay, Algeria, and Geneva. He then worked in Rome in the Second Section of the Secretariat of State. At the Pontifical University of Saint Thomas Aquinas, Angelicum he completed a doctorate in canon law in 1996 with a dissertation entitled "Canons 364 and 365, the Holy See and the State of Israel: an example of the logic of pontifical diplomacy.

He was appointed Chief of Protocol of the Secretariat of State on 4 September 2007. He speaks a number of languages including English, Italian, German, French, Spanish, in addition to Arabic.

On 12 November 2012, Pope Benedict XVI appointed him Titular Archbishop of Aquaviva and apostolic nuncio to Nicaragua. Pope Benedict consecrated him a bishop on 6 January 2013.

On 4 November 2017 Pope Francis appointed him apostolic nuncio to Trinidad and Tobago, Antigua and Barbuda, Barbados, Dominica, Jamaica, Saint Kitts and Nevis, Saint Vincent and the Grenadines, Guyana, and Apostolic Delegate to the Antilles. He received additional assignments: as Apostolic Nuncio to Saint Lucia, Grenada, and the Bahamas on 27 February 2018; as Apostolic Nuncio to Suriname on 9 March 2018; and Apostolic Nuncio to Belize on 8 September 2018.

On 17 December 2021, Pope Francis named him Permanent Observer of the Holy See to the United Nations in Geneva and at the World Trade Organisation (WTO) and Holy See Representative at the International Organisation for Migration (IOM). During his last month in this position, he addressed the Human Rights Council on the deprivation of human rights in Nicaragua, noting "the reported closure of several independent media outlets and non-governmental organizations, including faith-based organizations, and the allegations of the systematic use of violence by law enforcement in a climate of general impunity".

On 23 December 2021, following his Christmas address to senior members of the Roman Curia, Pope Francis gave each attendee three books he recommended, including  Nwachukwu's recent work on gossip, The Abused Word.

On 15 March 2023, Pope Francis named him secretary of the Section of First Evangelization of the Dicastery for Evangelization

Honors
He has received the following honors:
 Honorary Citizen of the State of Nebraska and the City of Lincoln (United States), 2008
 Officer of the Order of Merit of the Italian Republic, 2007
 Grand Officer of the Order of Bernardo O'Higgins (Chile), 2009
 Grand Cross of the Order of May (Argentina), 2011
 Grand Official of the Heraldic Order of Christopher Columbus (Dominican Republic), 2012
 Grand Cruz of di Order of José de Marcoleta (Nicaragua), 2018
 Title of "Chief Nwanne Di Na Mba 1 of Eziaba Agbani" awarded by the Eziaba Agbani Community of Enugu State, 2012

Notes

References

External links

 Catholic Hierarchy: Archbishop Fortunatus Nwachukwu 

1960 births
Living people
Nigerian Roman Catholics
People from Abia State
Roman Catholic titular archbishops
Apostolic Nuncios to Nicaragua
Apostolic Nuncios to Antigua and Barbuda
Apostolic Nuncios to the Bahamas
Apostolic Nuncios to Belize
Apostolic Nuncios to Barbados
Apostolic Nuncios to Dominica
Apostolic Nuncios to Jamaica
Apostolic Nuncios to Grenada
Apostolic Nuncios to Guyana
Apostolic Nuncios to Saint Kitts and Nevis
Apostolic Nuncios to Saint Lucia
Apostolic Nuncios to Suriname
Apostolic Nuncios to Saint Vincent and the Grenadines
Apostolic Nuncios to Trinidad and Tobago
Permanent Observers of the Holy See to the United Nations
Pontifical Ecclesiastical Academy alumni
Pontifical University of Saint Thomas Aquinas alumni
Pontifical Urban University alumni
Officials of the Roman Curia